François Noël is a masculine French name which may refer to:

 François Noël (missionary) (1651–1729), Flemish missionary and translator
 François-Joseph-Michel Noël (1756–1841), French diplomat and author

See also
 François-Noël Babeuf, 18th-century French journalist and agitator
 Francis (disambiguation)
 Noel (disambiguation)